Astra Taylor (born September 30, 1979) is a Canadian-American documentary filmmaker, writer, activist, and musician. She is a fellow of the Shuttleworth Foundation for her work on challenging predatory practices around debt.

Life
Born in Winnipeg, Manitoba, Taylor grew up in Athens, Georgia, and was unschooled until age 13 when she enrolled in ninth grade. At 16 she abandoned high school to attend classes at the University of Georgia; at the university she studied Deleuze and Guattari under Ronald L. Bogue. She has described herself as a "teenage Deleuzian."

Taylor enrolled at Brown University, where she attended classes for a year before dropping out. Reflecting on her decision to leave, Taylor stated "Why had I felt compelled to enroll in an Ivy League school, to excel by the standards of conventional education and choose a 'difficult' major, instead of making my own way? What was I afraid of?" Taylor completed a Master of Arts in liberal studies at The New School, though stated that she ultimately "wearied" of academia.

Taylor has taught sociology at the University of Georgia and SUNY New Paltz. Her writings have appeared in numerous magazines, including Dissent, n+1, Adbusters, The Baffler, The Nation, Salon, and The London Review of Books.

Taylor is the sister of painter and disability activist Sunny Taylor, and is married to Jeff Mangum of Neutral Milk Hotel. She joined Neutral Milk Hotel onstage for a number of shows in 2013 and 2014, playing guitar and accordion. She is a vegan. She lives in New York.

Activism
Taylor was active in the Occupy movement and was the co-editor of Occupy!: An OWS-Inspired Gazette with Sarah Leonard of Dissent magazine and Keith Gessen of n+1. The broadsheet covered Occupy Wall Street in five issues over the course of the first year of the occupation and was later anthologized by Verso Books. Taylor is a co-founder of Debt Collective, a debtors' union fighting to cancel debts.

Taylor has resisted the label "activist" in her writing and advocates organized movement building, which she says is a necessary supplement to activism which makes it more durable and effective.

She is also a member of the Democratic Socialists of America.

Works

Films
 Zizek!, 2005
 Examined Life, 2008
 What Is Democracy?, 2018

Writing
 Examined Life: Excursions with Contemporary Thinkers (editor), The New Press, 2009, 
 Occupy!: Scenes From Occupied America (co-editor), Verso, 2012, 
 The People's Platform: Taking Back Power and Culture in the Digital Age, Henry Holt and Company, 2014, 
"The faux-bot revolution", in A Field Guide to The Future of Work, RSA Future Work Centre, 2018
Democracy May Not Exist, but We'll Miss It When It's Gone, Metropolitan Books, 2019, 
Can't Pay, Won't Pay: The Case for Economic Disobedience and Debt Abolition (forward), Haymarket Books, 2020, 
Remake the World: Essays, Reflections, Rebellions, Haymarket Books, 2020,

Projects
 http://www.hiddendriver.com/ archived

Other works
Taylor occasionally performs with her husband's band, Neutral Milk Hotel.

Notes

External links 

 What Is Democracy?
 

1979 births
American documentary filmmakers
American people of Canadian descent
Brown University alumni
Canadian democratic socialists
Canadian documentary film directors
Film directors from Winnipeg
Homeschooling advocates
Living people
Members of the Democratic Socialists of America
Musicians from Athens, Georgia
Musicians from Winnipeg
Net neutrality
State University of New York at New Paltz faculty
The New School alumni
University of Georgia faculty
Writers from Athens, Georgia
Writers from Winnipeg
Women technology writers
American Book Award winners
American women documentary filmmakers
American women academics
21st-century American women
Canadian women documentary filmmakers
Canadian women film directors